Strik is a Dutch surname. Its origin may be toponymic or be related to one of the meanings of the Dutch words strik or strijk. Notable people with the name include:

Berend Strik (born 1960), Dutch visual artist
Ielja Strik (born 1973), Dutch powerlifter
Pleun Strik (born 1944), Dutch football defender
Reshad Strik (born 1981), Australian actor 
Tineke Strik (born 1961), Dutch GreenLeft politician
Wilfried Strik-Strikfeldt (1896–1977), Baltic German army officer

See also
Strik Yoma (died 1984), Micronesian politician
Strick, variant form of the surname

References

Dutch-language surnames